This is the list of awards received by Kara, a South Korean girl group formed by DSP Media in 2007.



Awards and nominations

Listicles

References 

Kara
Kara (South Korean group)